William Rawson (19 September 1865 – 6 August 1949) was an English painter known for his drypoint etchings and water colours of the moorlands around Sheffield. He lived at 321 Chesterfield Road in Sheffield.

References

English painters
English engravers
1865 births
1949 deaths